Kenneth Jennings (born October 10, 1947) is an American stage actor, most famous for his role as Tobias Ragg in the 1979 Broadway premiere of Stephen Sondheim's Sweeney Todd: The Demon Barber of Fleet Street. Jennings received the 1979 Drama Desk Award for Outstanding Featured Actor in a Musical for this role. He has also performed in several other shows, including Urinetown in 2001.

Jennings was born in Jersey City, New Jersey. He attended St. Peter's Preparatory School and St. Peter's College, both Catholic schools located in his hometown of Jersey City.

He performed the voice of Dinty Doyle in the 1981 Rankin/Bass stop motion animated Christmas special The Leprechauns' Christmas Gold, as well as Hunter #2 in the 1982 animated film The Last Unicorn.

NYC theatre credits
 1975: All God's Chillun Got Wings – Shorty
 1979: Sweeney Todd – Tobias Ragg
 1985: Mayor – Ensemble
 1989: Grand Hotel – Georg Strunk
 1994: A Christmas Carol – Lamplighter/Ghost of Christmas Past
 1997: London Assurance – Mr. Adolphus Spanker
 1997: Side Show – The Boss
 2001: Urinetown – Old Man Strong/Hot Blades Harry
 2006: Mimi le Duck – The Gypsy

Other performances
 Astuter Computer Revue at Epcot from October 1, 1982, to January 2, 1984

References

External links
 
 
 Sondheim.com: Side by Side with Ken Jennings
 
 

1947 births
Living people
American male musical theatre actors
American male stage actors
Male actors from Jersey City, New Jersey
Saint Peter's University alumni
St. Peter's Preparatory School alumni
Drama Desk Award winners